Sam Webster is an American writer, publisher, Thelemite, a member of the Golden Dawn tradition, and Bishop Tau Ty of Ecclesia Gnostica Universalis, as well as an initiate of Wicca. Webster holds a Master of Divinity degree from the Starr King School for the Ministry at the Graduate Theological Union in Berkeley, California. He advocates open source religion—the use of the open source paradigm in the field of spirituality.

He has written a number of articles and essays on occult and pagan topics, publishing both online and in modern pagan periodicals including Green Egg, Mezlim, Gnosis and PanGaea. Many of his essays on pagan dharma and Thelema have been made available online. In 2001, he was one of a number of Neopagans interviewed in Modern Pagans - An Investigation of Contemporary  Pagan Ritual, a feature article in the counter-cultural journal RE/Search.

He has founded or cofounded several occult and Pagan organizations, including the Chthonic-Ouranian OTO (1985) and the Open Source Order of the Golden Dawn (2002).
He self-published his book Tantric Thelema in January 2010.

Writings

Books

Articles

Constellation, 1984.
Abyss and Back, 1988.
A metaphor is something like a bucket, 1988.
What's Crowley got to do with Thelema, Anyway?, 1988.
The Rite of the Milk of the Stars, 1990.
"The Spell of Ra-Hoor-Khuit" in Mezlim, Beltane 1990.
"The House of Khabs" in Mezlim, Samhain, 1991.
The Star Child, 1991.
Process in the Symbolic Re-Creation of the World, 1992.
Rite of Passage Structure in the Japanese Accession Ceremonies, 1992.
Changing Society through Ritual, 1993.
What is Polytheism and how I became Polytheistic, 1993.
"Working Polytheism" in Gnosis #28, Spring 1993.Home
The World as Lover Working, 1993.
"Structural Implications in the Sepherot", 1994.
"Pagan Dharma" in Gnosis #39, Spring, 1996.Home
The Bones of Sex and Spirit, 1996.
"Why I call Myself Pagan", 1999 in Reclaiming Quarterly The Spiral Dance - History and Traditions
"Pagan Dharma 2" in PanGaea, 1999.
A Thelemic Ganachakra, 2001. (see Ganachakra)
Entering the Buddhadharma, 2002.OSOGD: Library: Entering the Buddhadharma
Preliminary notes towards an understanding of the Neophyte Hall in the Open Source Order of the Golden Dawn., 2002.OSOGD: Library: Y Documents: Understanding the Neophyte Hall
Towards a General Theory of Divination, 2002. The Open Source Order of the Golden Dawn
Ritual, Magick & How Pagans will Save the World, 2004.
The Pagan Agenda, 2005.

Notes

Sources

Further reading
Brooks, Andrew. Beltane Keynote Speaker Urges Pagan Revival in The Oberlin Review, April 21, 2006.
Magliocco, Sabina. Witching Culture: Folklore and Neo-Paganism in America. University of Pennsylvania Press, 2004. 
Vale, V. and John Sulak (2001). Modern Pagans. San Francisco: Re/Search Publications.

External links
Chthonic Auranian Templars of Thelema
Ecclesia Gnostica Universalis

Living people
American occult writers
American Thelemites
American Wiccans
Ceremonial magicians
Hermetic Order of the Golden Dawn
Starr King School for the Ministry alumni
Year of birth missing (living people)